Berezney or Bereznay is a surname. Notable people with the surname include:

András Bereznay, Hungarian-born cartographer and historian
Paul Berezney (1915–1990), American football player
Pete Berezney (1923–2008), American football player